'54-40 or Fight' is the first book in a trilogy by Emerson Hough. The next two books in the trilogy are Purchase Price and John Rawn. The title references the expansion of the United States that President James K. Polk called for. The expansion was to include Texas, California, and the Oregon territory. Since the northern boundary of Oregon was the latitude line of 54 degrees, 40 minutes, "fifty-four forty or fight!" became a popular slogan. The book was dedicated to Theodore Roosevelt. 54-40 or Fight was a financial success.

Notes

Sources
 E., Wylder, Delbert (1981). Emerson Hough. Boston: Twayne Publishers. . OCLC 6916169.

External links

 Free Google Books copy of 54-40 or Fight

1904 non-fiction books
American history books
History books about the United States
Bobbs-Merrill Company books